Makaryevsky District is an administrative and municipal district (raion), one of the twenty-four in Kostroma Oblast, Russia. It is located in the south of the oblast. Its administrative center is the town of Makaryev. Population:  19,523 (2002 Census);  The population of Makaryev accounts for 53.0% of the district's total population.

References

Notes

Sources

Districts of Kostroma Oblast